Frosio is a surname. Notable people with the surname include:

 Cinzia Frosio, Italian figure skater
 Elia Frosio (1913–2005), Italian cyclist
 Ivo Frosio (1930–2019), Swiss footballer
 Pierluigi Frosio (1948–2022), Italian football player and manager